Ivo Moring (born August 27, 1971) is a German music producer, songwriter, and percussionist best known for his work with DJ Otzi as co-producer of “Ein Stern”. He has worked with Heather Nova, Darren Hayes of Savage Garden, Jennifer Paige, Sarah Brightman, Limahl, Jordan Knight & New Kids On The Block, Cazzette, Sarah Connor, Lutricia McNeal, Chris Norman, Oonagh, Beyond the Black, Christina Stürmer, and Sandra und Coolio.

Career 

Moring began playing percussion professionally in the orchestra of the Hamburg State Opera.

Ivo Moring has worked with Heather Nova, Darren Hayes of Savage Garden, Jennifer Paige, Sarah Brightman, Limahl, Jordan Knight & New Kids on the Block, Sarah Connor, Lutricia McNeal, Chris Norman, Beyond the Black, Sandra und Coolio.

In 2007, he co-produced “Ein Stern” by DJ Otzi, peaking at #1 and remaining on the chart for 12 weeks. It became the 2nd most successful song in German chart history.

Ivo Moring composed 60 minutes of music in 7.1 surround-sound for the Blu-ray-movie project BluElement's "Forsenses", released worldwide in 2009. It became the best selling national music Blu-ray DVD in Germany. The follow-up film "Timberlounge" reached the Top 10 in the national DVD-charts.

Moring was the co-writer of "Nie Genug" by Christina Stürmer, "Space Cowboy", and "Perfect Love". He produced "Idiot", which received the award for "Hit of the Year 2012" in Germany.

In 2014, he produced and co-wrote two albums by Oonagh, receiving two ECHO-awards.

Moring co-wrote "Blind Heart" by Swedish-based DJ Duo Cazzette, which reached No 1 on the Billboard Dance Chart in 2015.

Moring produced an album for Wendy Starland, who played a role in discovering Lady Gaga. In a Billboard story after winning her case against Rob Fusari, Starland stated "We’ve created a stadium rock sound that is not something I’ve heard before from any other female solo artist."

In 2016 Moring and BMG Rights Management founded "EduArtists", a label for educational music for children. In 2018 Moring wrote and produced an album in nine different languages for the international language learning platform Bambino Lingo. He developed Fabi Fuchs, a music brand for children, with the first album released by Amazon originals in 2018.

In 2018 Moring was a producer of "Meteor" by Matthias Reim. "Meteor" reached number 3 on the German album charts.

Moring released numerous songs and productions in the style of downbeat, zero-beat, chill-out, ambient and lounge. International album-releases of his own projects include "TRANQUILLO" and "SUGARMAN".

On March 20, 2020, China's first male bel canto quartet, Super Vocal, performed "Qui Con Me (Ni De Se Cai 你的色彩)" (Your Colors) on the Hunan Satellite TV singing competition "Singer 2020", bilingual with Italian and Chinese lyrics. The performance received more than 40 million views in 24 hours.  The studio version single of "Ni De Se Cai" was released on March 27, 2020 by Decca China.  “Ni De Se Cai” is composed by George Komsky, Roxanne Seeman, and Moring with Italian lyrics “Qui Con Me" written by Saverio Principini, and Chinese lyrics “Ni De Se Cai" written by Cheng He.  The song was produced by Nick Patrick and Wu Qinglong.

References

External links
 Directory Hitparade
 Directory Discogs
 Artist website
 eduartists.de

1971 births
Living people
Musicians from Hamburg
German songwriters
German record producers